The Szydłowiecki (plural: Szydłowieccy, feminine form: Szydłowiecka) was a Polish szlachta (nobility) family. A branch of the House of Odrowąż. Magnates in the Kingdom of Poland and the First Republic of Poland.

Their family nest was Szydłowiec at the Korzeniówka river near Radom in Masovia.

Notable members

 Krzysztof Szydłowiecki
 Jakub Szydłowiecki
 Mikołaj Szydłowiecki
 Elżbieta Szydłowiecka

Coat of arms
The Szydłowiecki family used the Odrowąż coat of arms.

Genealogical tree

Bibliography
 Stefan Rosiński (red.): Mikołaj i Krzysztof Szydłowieccy - patroni turnieju rycerskiego. Szydłowiec: Muzeum Ludowych Instrumentów Muzycznych, 2006.